The Chosun Exhibition was held to mark the 20th anniversary of the Japanese colony in Korea. 
It was held at Gyeongbokgung, opened on 12 September 1929, ran until 31 October 1929 and was attended by 986,179 people.

Contents
As well as a Reception Hall there were Navy, rice, fisheries,
Industries South,
Industries North, Electric Machinery, Ministry of Railways
Gyeonghoeru
and Jeonnam pavilions. Japan itself was represented by the Domestic Pavilion.

There was a Children's Land with a locomotive and a panoramic picture of elephants in India, a moving pictures pavilion.  
The Architectural Association of Chosun had a display of three model houses showing modern housing. 
and the Gakutensoku robot was shown.

References 

1929 disestablishments in Asia
1929 disestablishments
1929 establishments in Korea
20th century in Japan
20th century in Korea
Events in Seoul
World's fairs in Korea
 Colonial exhibitions